Kurt Bahr is an American businessman and Republican politician from the state of Missouri. He is currently the St. Charles County Director of Elections.

Bahr was first elected to the Missouri House of Representatives from Missouri's 19th District in November 2010, and re-elected after that to the state's 102nd District. He represented a portion of Saint Charles County in the Weldon Spring area, straddling U.S. Route 40/61 on both sides of the Weldon Spring Conservation Area. Bahr previously served in the United States Air Force from 2001 to 2006. Term limited in 2018, Bahr instead ran for and won the office of St. Charles County Director of Elections. Republican Ron Hicks was elected to succeed him in 2019 as the representative from District 102.

Election results

References

21st-century American politicians
Living people
Oklahoma Wesleyan University alumni
People from O'Fallon, Missouri
People from St. Charles, Missouri
Republican Party members of the Missouri House of Representatives
Year of birth missing (living people)